This article lists described species of the family Asilidae start with letter H.

A
B
C
D
E
F
G
H
I
J
K
L
M
N
O
P
Q
R
S
T
U
V
W
Y
Z

List of Species

Genus Habropogon
 Habropogon aegyptius (Efflatoun, 1937)
 Habropogon aerivagus (Séguy, 1953)
 Habropogon albibarbis (Macquart, 1838)
 Habropogon appendiculatus (Schiner, 1867)
 Habropogon bacescui (Weinberg & Tsacas, 1973)
 Habropogon balachowskyi (Weinberg & Tsacas, 1973)
 Habropogon bipartitus (Villeneuve, 1931)
 Habropogon capensis (Londt, 1981)
 Habropogon carthaginiensis (Becker, 1915)
 Habropogon cochraneae (Londt, 2000)
 Habropogon decipiens (Theodor, 1980)
 Habropogon deserticola (Lehr, 1960)
 Habropogon distipilosus (Weinberg & Tsacas, 1973)
 Habropogon doriae (Rondani, 1873)
 Habropogon elongatulus (Efflatoun, 1937)
 Habropogon francoisi (Janssens, 1969)
 Habropogon fulvulus (Theodor, 1980)
 Habropogon hauseri (Hradský & Geller-Grimm, 2005)
 Habropogon hessei (Londt, 2000)
 Habropogon hilaryae (Londt, 2000)
 Habropogon karooensis (Londt, 2000)
 Habropogon latifrons (Loew, 1871)
 Habropogon lineatus (Lehr, 1960)
 Habropogon longiventris (Loew, 1847)
 Habropogon malkovskii (Lehr, 1960)
 Habropogon montanus (Lehr, 1960)
 Habropogon namibiensis (Londt, 1999)
 Habropogon odontophallus (Weinberg & Tsacas, 1973)
 Habropogon parappendiculatus (Weinberg & Tsacas, 1973)
 Habropogon pertusus (Becker, 1908)
 Habropogon prionophallus (Weinberg & Tsacas, 1973)
 Habropogon pyrrhophaeus (Weinberg & Tsacas, 1973)
 Habropogon rubriventris (Macquart, 1849)
 Habropogon rufulus (Lehr, 1960)
 Habropogon senilis (Wulp, 1899)
 Habropogon similimus (Theodor, 1980)
 Habropogon tricolor (Theodor, 1980)
 Habropogon verticalis (Becker, 1913)
 Habropogon vittatus (Weinberg & Tsacas, 1973)

Genus Hadrokolos
 Hadrokolos cazieri (Martin, 1959)
 Hadrokolos notialis (Martin, 1967)
 Hadrokolos pritchardi (Martin, 1959)
 Hadrokolos texanus (Bromley, 1934)

Genus Haplopogon
 Haplopogon bullatus (Bromley, 1934)
 Haplopogon dicksoni (Wilcox, 1966)
 Haplopogon erinus (Pritchard, 1941)
 Haplopogon nudus (Engel, 1930)
 Haplopogon parkeri (Wilcox, 1966)
 Haplopogon triangulatus (Martin, 1955)
 Haplopogon utahensis (Wilcox, 1966)

Genus Haroldia
 Haroldia oldroydi (Londt, 1999)
 Haroldia trivialis (Oldroyd, 1974)

Genus Harpagobroma
 Harpagobroma fumosum (Hull, 1962)

Genus Heligmonevra
 Heligmonevra africana (Ricardo, 1925)
 Heligmonevra albiseta (Martin, 1964)
 Heligmonevra anamalaiensis (Joseph & Parui, 1980)
 Heligmonevra andamenensis (Joseph & Parui, 1980)
 Heligmonevra assamensis (Joseph & Parui, 1987)
 Heligmonevra astricta (Martin, 1964)
 Heligmonevra bengalensis (Joseph & Parui, 1986)
 Heligmonevra bigoti (Joseph & Parui, 1984)
 Heligmonevra calceoIaria (Scarbrough & Duncan, 2004)
 Heligmonevra chaetoprocta (Hull, 1962)
 Heligmonevra cheriani (Joseph & Parui, 1980)
 Heligmonevra debilis (Walker, 1857)
 Heligmonevra didymoides (Walker, 1864)
 Heligmonevra divaricata (Oldroyd, 1972)
 Heligmonevra dravidica (Joseph & Parui, 1980)
 Heligmonevra elaphra (Oldroyd, 1972)
 Heligmonevra flagrans (Walker, 1857)
 Heligmonevra flavida (Martin, 1964)
 Heligmonevra forcipatus (Meijere, 1915)
 Heligmonevra frommeri (Joseph & Parui, 1980)
 Heligmonevra gracilis (Martin, 1964)
 Heligmonevra himalayana (Joseph & Parui, 1987)
 Heligmonevra incisuralis (Joseph & Parui, 1986)
 Heligmonevra insularis (Engel, 1927)
 Heligmonevra kumaunensis (Joseph & Parui, 1980)
 Heligmonevra ladakhensis (Joseph & Parui, 1987)
 Heligmonevra laevis (Walker, 1861)
 Heligmonevra laevis (Engel, 1927)
 Heligmonevra lata (Martin, 1964)
 Heligmonevra lavignei (Joseph & Parui, 1980)
 Heligmonevra litoralis (Lindner, 1955)
 Heligmonevra macula (Martin, 1964)
 Heligmonevra madagascarensis (Bromley, 1942)
 Heligmonevra mediana (Bromley, 1931)
 Heligmonevra mehtai (Joseph & Parui, 1993)
 Heligmonevra miniata (Oldroyd, 1960)
 Heligmonevra modesta (Bigot, 1858)
 Heligmonevra nigra (Martin, 1964)
 Heligmonevra nigrifascia (Martin, 1964)
 Heligmonevra nigrostriata (Engel, 1930)
 Heligmonevra nuda (Bezzi, 1906)
 Heligmonevra occidentalis (Ricardo, 1925)
 Heligmonevra ornata (Lindner, 1955)
 Heligmonevra poonmudiensis (Joseph & Parui, 1980)
 Heligmonevra pulcher (Ricardo, 1919)
 Heligmonevra pygmaea (Oldroyd, 1972)
 Heligmonevra ricardoi (Joseph & Parui, 1980)
 Heligmonevra rodhaini (Oldroyd, 1970)
 Heligmonevra rubripes (Ricardo, 1922)
 Heligmonevra rufipes (Meijere, 1913)
 Heligmonevra russea (Martin, 1964)
 Heligmonevra seminuda (Oldroyd, 1972)
 Heligmonevra shimogaensis (Joseph & Parui, 1980)
 Heligmonevra spreta (Wulp, 1898)
 Heligmonevra sula (Oldroyd, 1972)
 Heligmonevra trifurca (Shi, 1992)
 Heligmonevra tsacasi (Joseph & Parui, 1986)
 Heligmonevra yenpingensis (Bromley, 1928)

Genus Helolaphyctis
 Helolaphyctis chrysorhea (Hull, 1958)
 Helolaphyctis nitida (Hull, 1958)

Genus Hermannomyia
 Hermannomyia engeli (Hull, 1962)
 Hermannomyia oldroydi Londt, 1981
 Hermannomyia ukasi Londt & Copeland, 2013

Genus Heteropogon
 Heteropogon alter (Becker, 1915)
 Heteropogon arizonensis (Wilcox, 1941)
 Heteropogon aurocinctus (Séguy, 1934)
 Heteropogon cazieri (Wilcox, 1965)
 Heteropogon chircahua (Wilcox, 1965)
 Heteropogon cirrhatus (Osten-Sacken, 1877)
 Heteropogon currani (Pritchard, 1935)
 Heteropogon davisi (Wilcox, 1965)
 Heteropogon dejectus (Williston, 1901)
 Heteropogon divisus (Coquillett, 1902)
 Heteropogon dorothyae (Martin, 1962)
 Heteropogon duncani (Wilcox, 1941)
 Heteropogon eburnus (Walker, 1849)
 Heteropogon elegans (Becker, 1907)
 Heteropogon erinaceus (Loew, 1871)
 Heteropogon filicornis (Loew, 1871)
 Heteropogon fisheri (Wilcox, 1965)
 Heteropogon flavobarbatus (Becker, 1907)
 Heteropogon impudicus (Janssens, 1961)
 Heteropogon lautus (Loew, 1872)
 Heteropogon lehri (Richter, 1968)
 Heteropogon loewi (Lehr, 1970)
 Heteropogon ludius (Coquillett, 1893)
 Heteropogon lugubris (Hermann, 1906)
 Heteropogon maculinervis (James, 1937)
 Heteropogon manicatus (Meigen, 1820)
 Heteropogon manni (Loew, 1854)
 Heteropogon martini (Wilcox, 1965)
 Heteropogon nitidus (Oldroyd, 1964)
 Heteropogon ornatipes (Loew, 1851)
 Heteropogon palaestinensis (Theodor, 1980)
 Heteropogon patruelis (Coquillett, 1893)
 Heteropogon paurosomus (Pritchard, 1935)
 Heteropogon phalna (Walker, 1849)
 Heteropogon phoenicurus (Loew, 1872)
 Heteropogon rejectus (Williston, 1901)
 Heteropogon rubidus (Coquillett, 1893)
 Heteropogon rubrifasciatus (Bromley, 1931)
 Heteropogon scoparius (Loew, 1847)
 Heteropogon senilis (Bigot, 1878)
 Heteropogon spatulatus (Pritchard, 1935)
 Heteropogon stonei (Wilcox, 1965)
 Heteropogon succinctus (Loew, 1847)
 Heteropogon timondavidi (Tsacas, 1970)
 Heteropogon tolandi (Wilcox, 1965)
 Heteropogon wilcoxi (James, 1934)
 Heteropogon willistoni (Martin, 1962)

Genus Hippomachus
 Hippomachus amnoni (Londt, 1985)
 Hippomachus engeli (Londt, 1983)
 Hippomachus furcatus (Londt, 1985)
 Hippomachus hermanni (Londt, 1983)
 Hippomachus iranensis (Londt, 1985)
 Hippomachus leechi (Londt, 1985)
 Hippomachus rossi (Londt, 1985)

Genus Hodites
 Hodites punctissima (Hull, 1962)

Genus Hodophylax
 Hodophylax aridus (James, 1933)
 Hodophylax basingeri (Pritchard, 1938)
 Hodophylax halli (Wilcox, 1961)
 Hodophylax tolandi (Wilcox, 1961)

Genus Holcocephala
 Holcocephala affinis (Bellardi, 1861)
 Holcocephala agalla (Walker, 1849)
 Holcocephala bechyneorum (Ayala, 1982)
 Holcocephala calva (Loew, 1872)
 Holcocephala curvicosta (Carrera, 1958)
 Holcocephala deltoidea (Bellardi, 1861)
 Holcocephala dimidiata (Hermann, 1924)
 Holcocephala fernandezi (Ayala, 1982)
 Holcocephala fimbriata (Hermann, 1924)
 Holcocephala fusca (Bromley, 1951)
 Holcocephala indigena (Scarbrough, 2003)
 Holcocephala inornata (Rondani, 1848)
 Holcocephala macula (Rondani, 1848)
 Holcocephala matteii (Ayala, 1982)
 Holcocephala minuta (Bellardi, 1861)
 Holcocephala mogiana (Carrera, 1955)
 Holcocephala monticola (Ayala, 1982)
 Holcocephala nodosipes (Enderlein, 1914)
 Holcocephala obscuripennis (Enderlein, 1914)
 Holcocephala oculata (Fabricius, 1805)
 Holcocephala pardalina (Hermann, 1924)
 Holcocephala pectinata (Carrera, 1955)
 Holcocephala pennipes (Hermann, 1924)
 Holcocephala peruviana (Hermann, 1924)
 Holcocephala rufithorax (Wiedemann, 1828)
 Holcocephala scopifer (Schiner, 1868)
 Holcocephala spinipes (Hermann, 1924)
 Holcocephala stylata (Pritchard, 1938)
 Holcocephala uruguayensis (Lynch & Arribálzaga, 1882)
 Holcocephala vallestris (Ayala, 1982)
 Holcocephala vicina (Macquart, 1838)
 Holcocephala vittata (Walker, 1837)

Genus Holopogon
 Holopogon acropennis (Martin, 1959)
 Holopogon albipilosus (Curran, 1923)
 Holopogon angustifacies (Lehr, 1972)
 Holopogon atrifrons (Cole, 1924)
 Holopogon atripennis (Back, 1909)
 Holopogon auribarbis (Meigen, 1820)
 Holopogon binotatus (Loew, 1870)
 Holopogon bullatus (Wulp, 1882)
 Holopogon chalcogaster (Dufour, 1850)
 Holopogon claripennis (Loew, 1856)
 Holopogon cognatus (Richter, 1964)
 Holopogon cornutus (Theodor, 1980)
 Holopogon currani (Martin, 1959)
 Holopogon dichromatopus (Bezzi, 1926)
 Holopogon dolicharista (Lehr, 1972)
 Holopogon fisheri (Martin, 1967)
 Holopogon flavotibialis (Strobl, 1909)
 Holopogon imbecillus (Loew, 1871)
 Holopogon japonicus (Nagatomi, 1983)
 Holopogon kirgizorum (Peck, 1977)
 Holopogon kiritshenkoi (Lehr, 1972)
 Holopogon kugleri (Theodor, 1980)
 Holopogon melaleucus (Meigen, 1820)
 Holopogon melas (Dufour, 1852)
 Holopogon mica (Martin, 1967)
 Holopogon mingusae (Martin, 1959)
 Holopogon negrus (Lehr, 1972)
 Holopogon nigripennis (Meigen, 1820)
 Holopogon nigripilosa (Adisoemarto, 1967)
 Holopogon nigropilosus (Theodor, 1980)
 Holopogon oriens (Martin, 1959)
 Holopogon pulcher (Williston, 1901)
 Holopogon pusillus (Macquart, 1838)
 Holopogon quadrinotatus (Séguy, 1953)
 Holopogon rugiventris (Strobl, 1906)
 Holopogon sapphirus (Martin, 1967)
 Holopogon seniculus (Loew, 1866)
 Holopogon siculus (Macquart, 1834)
 Holopogon snowi (Back, 1909)
 Holopogon stellatus (Martin, 1959)
 Holopogon turkmenicus (Lehr, 1972)
 Holopogon ui (Tomasovic, 2005)
 Holopogon violaceus (Williston, 1901)
 Holopogon vockerothi (Martin, 1959)
 Holopogon wilcoxi (Martin, 1959)

Genus Hoplistomerus
 Hoplistomerus caliginosus (Wulp, 1899)
 Hoplistomerus erythropus (Bezzi, 1915)
 Hoplistomerus garambensis (Oldroyd, 1970)
 Hoplistomerus miniatus (Oldroyd, 1940)
 Hoplistomerus nobilis (Loew, 1858)
 Hoplistomerus oldroydi (Londt, 2007)
 Hoplistomerus pegos (Londt, 2007)
 Hoplistomerus quintillus (Oldroyd, 1940)
 Hoplistomerus zelimina (Speiser, 1910)

Genus Hoplopheromerus
 Hoplopheromerus guangdongi (Tomasovic, 2006)
 Hoplopheromerus hirtiventris (Becker, 1925)
 Hoplopheromerus podagricus (Bezzi, 1914)
 Hoplopheromerus brunnescens (Tsacas & Oldroyd, 1967)
 Hoplopheromerus brunnipes (Tsacas & Oldroyd, 1967)
 Hoplopheromerus flavescens (Tsacas & Oldroyd, 1967)
 Hoplopheromerus nigroides (Tsacas & Oldroyd, 1967)
 Hoplopheromerus nigropilosus (Tsacas & Oldroyd, 1967)

Genus Hoplotriclis
 Hoplotriclis pallasii (Wiedemann, 1828)

Genus Hullia
 Hullia commoni (Paramonov, 1964)

Genus Hybozelodes
 Hybozelodes acuticornis (Carrera, 1945)
 Hybozelodes albipes (Hermann, 1912)
 Hybozelodes clausicella (Carrera, 1960)
 Hybozelodes comatus (Hermann, 1912)
 Hybozelodes conjungens (Hermann, 1912)
 Hybozelodes dispar (Hermann, 1912)
 Hybozelodes fulvipes (Hermann, 1912)
 Hybozelodes lucidus (Hermann, 1912)
 Hybozelodes marginatus (Osten-Sacken, 1887)
 Hybozelodes nigellus (Hermann, 1912)
 Hybozelodes pennatus (Hermann, 1912)
 Hybozelodes pictus (Hermann, 1912)
 Hybozelodes platycerus (Hermann, 1912)

Genus Hynirhynchus
 Hynirhynchus pantherinus (Bigot, 1879)
 Hynirhynchus zebra (Lindner, 1955)

Genus Hypenetes
 Hypenetes aconcaguanus (Artigas & Lewis & Parra, 2005)
 Hypenetes aegialodes (Londt, 1985)
 Hypenetes angulatus (Artigas & Lewis & Parra, 2005)
 Hypenetes argothrix (Londt, 1985)
 Hypenetes asiliformis (Wulp, 1882)
 Hypenetes critesi Artigas, 1970
 Hypenetes cryodes (Londt, 1985)
 Hypenetes davidsoni Artigas, 1970
 Hypenetes dicranus (Londt, 1985)
 Hypenetes digitatus Artigas, 1970
 Hypenetes dorattina (Londt, 1985)
 Hypenetes fucosoides (Artigas & Lewis & Parra, 2005)
 Hypenetes fucosus Artigas, 1970
 Hypenetes galactodes (Oldroyd, 1974)
 Hypenetes greatheadi (Oldroyd, 1974)
 Hypenetes grisescens (Engel, 1929)
 Hypenetes hessei (Londt, 1985)
 Hypenetes huasquinus (Artigas & Lewis & Parra, 2005)
 Hypenetes irwini (Oldroyd, 1974)
 Hypenetes leucoptera (Artigas & Lewis & Parra, 2005)
 Hypenetes leucotrica (Artigas & Lewis & Parra, 2005)
 Hypenetes loewi (Londt, 1985)
 Hypenetes macrocerus (Londt, 1985)
 Hypenetes magellanicus Artigas, 1970
 Hypenetes miles (Oldroyd, 1974)
 Hypenetes morosus (Oldroyd, 1974)
 Hypenetes nahuelbutae (Artigas & Lewis & Parra, 2005)
 Hypenetes obtusus (Engel, 1929)
 Hypenetes oldroydi (Londt, 1985)
 Hypenetes purpureus (Artigas & Lewis & Parra, 2005)
 Hypenetes pylochrysites (Londt, 1985)
 Hypenetes rexi (Londt, 1985)
 Hypenetes rotundus (Oldroyd, 1974)
 Hypenetes schineri Artigas, 1970
 Hypenetes spinipes (Artigas & Lewis & Parra, 2005)
 Hypenetes stigmatias Loew, 1858
 Hypenetes stuckenbergi (Londt, 1985)
 Hypenetes sturmias (Oldroyd, 1974)
 Hypenetes tregualemuensis (Artigas & Lewis & Parra, 2005)
 Hypenetes turneri (Londt, 1985)
 Hypenetes valentinei Artigas, 1970

Genus Hyperechia
 Hyperechia albifasciata (Enderlein, 1930)
 Hyperechia bomboides (Loew, 1851)
 Hyperechia fera (Wulp, 1872)
 Hyperechia floccosa (Bezzi, 1908)
 Hyperechia fuelleborni (Grünberg, 1907)
 Hyperechia hirtipes (Fabricius, 1805)
 Hyperechia imitator (Grünberg, 1907)
 Hyperechia marshalli (Austen, 1902)
 Hyperechia nigripennis (Wiedemann, 1830)
 Hyperechia nigrita (Grünberg, 1907)
 Hyperechia pellitiventris (Enderlein, 1930)
 Hyperechia xylocopiformis (Walker, 1849)

Genus Hystrichopogon
 Hystrichopogon hirticeps (Hermann, 1906)

References 

 
Asilidae